The Joseph Schlitz Brewing Company was an American brewery based in Milwaukee, Wisconsin, and once the largest producers of beer in the United States. Its namesake beer, Schlitz, was known as "The beer that made Milwaukee famous" and was advertised with the slogan "When you're out of Schlitz, you're out of beer". Schlitz first became the largest beer producer in the US in 1902 and enjoyed that status at several points during the first half of the 20th century, exchanging the title with Anheuser-Busch multiple times during the 1950s.

The company was founded by August Krug in 1849, but ownership passed to Joseph Schlitz in 1858 when he married Krug's widow. Schlitz was bought by Stroh Brewery Company in 1982 and subsequently sold along with the rest of Stroh's assets to Pabst Brewing Company in 1999. Pabst produced several varieties of Schlitz beers alongside Old Milwaukee.

On November 13, 2014, Pabst announced that it had completed its sale to Blue Ribbon Intermediate Holdings, LLC. Blue Ribbon is a partnership between American beer entrepreneur Eugene Kashper and TSG Consumer Partners, a San Francisco-based, private-equity firm. Prior reports suggested the price agreed upon was around $700 million.

History

Beginnings

In Milwaukee, Joseph Schlitz was hired as a bookkeeper in a tavern brewery owned by August Krug. In 1856, he took over management of the brewery following the death of Krug. In 1858, Schlitz married the widow, Anna Maria Krug, and then changed the name of the brewery to the Jos. Schlitz Brewing Co. in 1861, Krug's 16-year-old nephew, August Uihlein, began employment at the brewery.

The often circulated story of Schlitz' proposed donation of thousands of barrels of beer to the Chicago population after the Great Chicago Fire of 1871 is simply a modern myth, pushed by later marketing campaigns. Schlitz' national expansion was based on new distribution points in Chicago and elsewhere, and the consequent use of the railway. From the late 1880s, Schlitz built dozens of tied houses in Chicago, most with a concrete relief of the company logo embedded in the brickwork; several of these buildings survive today, including the Lake Street Schlitz Tied House at the corner of Lake and Loomis and Schuba's Tavern at the corner of Belmont and Southport.  In 1873, Schlitz rejected a purchase offer from Tennessee brewer Bratton and Sons.

In 1875, Schlitz returned to his homeland on the SS Schiller. While returning home, the ship hit a rock near the Isles of Scilly and sank, killing Schlitz and 334 others. His body was never recovered. Honoring Krug's wishes, Schlitz had it written in his own will that he also wanted the Uihlein brothers to run the brewery when he died. Management was promptly passed to the four Uihlein brothers, August, Henry, Alfred and Edward. When Anna Maria Krug Schlitz died in 1887, the Uihleins acquired complete ownership of the firm, and the Uihlein family continued to run the brewery for over one hundred years. Despite this change, the Uihleins decided to keep the name Schlitz, as Americans had difficulty pronouncing their surname.

Prohibition and success

The company flourished through much of the 1900s, starting in 1902 when the production of one million barrels of beer surpassed Pabst's claim as the largest brewery in the United States. Schlitz began pioneering numerous advances in the brewing industry, most notably the use of brown glass bottles beginning in 1912. Previously, beer was bottled in clear glass bottles, but this allowed sunlight to spoil the flavor of the beer. The entire industry quickly adopted the brown bottle, and the design is still used to this day. Schlitz's pioneering of the brown bottle was the inspiration for the Schlitz Brown Bottle Restaurant in Milwaukee, which opened in 1938.

However, their success would meet the first of several major obstacles. In the early 1900s, the temperance movement was gaining traction, and production and consumption of alcohol was eventually outlawed entirely with the passage of Prohibition in the United States in 1920. During Prohibition, Schlitz faced difficulties trying to stay open and keep their workers employed. In 1919, with Prohibition imminent, Joseph E. Uihlein Sr. created a division of Schlitz that would produce milk chocolate, looking to make good use of Wisconsin's large dairy industry. The chocolate was sold under the Eline brand (the phonetic pronunciation of Uihlein). However, Eline Chocolate did not have much success, as the Hershey company was dominant in the highly competitive chocolate industry, and Eline candies were often rife with quality control problems. Despite pouring millions into the chocolate division and creating a hard candy and gumball line, the venture was a failure and was abandoned by 1928. 

This forced the company to change its name from Schlitz Brewing Company to the Schlitz Beverage Company and changed its "famous" slogan to "The drink that made Milwaukee famous." Schlitz primarily focused on producing malt extract and non-alcoholic soft drinks called Schlitz Famo that they used to keep the brewing equipment operational, as the Uihleins correctly deduced that Prohibition would not be permanent. After Prohibition ended in late 1933, Schlitz again began producing beer and quickly became the world's top-selling brewery in 1934.

First union strike and decline
In 1953, Milwaukee brewery workers went on a 76-day strike. The strike greatly impacted Schlitz's production, including all of Milwaukee's other breweries and allowed Anheuser-Busch to surpass Schlitz in the American beer market.  The popularity of Schlitz's namesake beer, along with the introduction of value-priced Old Milwaukee, allowed Schlitz to regain the number-one position.  Schlitz and Anheuser-Busch continued to compete for the top brewery in America for years.  Schlitz remained the number-two brewery in America as late as 1976.

By 1967, the company's president and chairman was August Uihlein's grandson, Robert Uihlein, Jr. Faced with a desire to meet large volume demands while also cutting the cost of production, the brewing process for Schlitz's flagship Schlitz beer was changed in the early 1970s. The primary changes involved using corn syrup to replace some of the malted barley, adding a silica gel to prevent the product from forming a haze, using high-temperature fermentation instead of the traditional method, and also substituted less-expensive extracts rather than traditional ingredients. Schlitz also experimented with continuous fermentation, even building a new brewery specifically designed to use the process in Baldwinsville, New York. The reformulated product resulted in a beer that not only lost much of the flavor and consistency of the traditional formula, but also spoiled more quickly, rapidly losing public appeal.

In 1976, concern was growing that the Food and Drug Administration would require all ingredients to be labeled on their bottles and cans.  To prevent having to disclose the artificial additive of the silica gel, Uihlein switched to an agent called "Chill-garde" which would be filtered out at the end of production, so would be considered nondisclosable. The agent reacted badly with a foam stabilizer that was used and Schlitz recalled 10 million bottles of beer, costing it $1.4 million. Schlitz was further hurt by the rise of high-volume light beers such as Miller Lite and Bud Light, a direction Schlitz did not aggressively pursue – although James Coburn appeared in commercials for the short-lived Schlitz Light in 1976.

As part of its efforts to reverse the sales decline, Schlitz launched a disastrous 1977 television ad campaign created by Leo Burnett & Co. In each of the ads, an off-screen speaker tries to convince a Schlitz drinker to switch to a rival beer. The Schlitz drinker then talked about how they would never switch and jokingly threatened the person trying to persuade them away from their favorite beer. Despite the tone of the campaign intended to be comedic levity, audiences found the campaign somewhat menacing and the ad industry dubbed it "Drink Schlitz or I'll kill you." Schlitz, unwilling to endure more bad press, pulled the campaign after 10 weeks and fired Burnett.

Second union strike and sale to Stroh
By the 1980s, Schlitz had rebounded somewhat, but it had now fallen from the second-most-popular brewery in the country to the fourth, as Miller and Pabst had overtaken it for the first time in decades. The final blow to the company was another crippling strike at the Milwaukee plant in 1981. About 700 production workers went on strike on June 1, 1981. The strike was triggered because there was no replacement contract when the union's contract expired. 

The strike lasted for almost four months, and the company quickly abandoned all remaining hope that it could be saved, as all previous attempts were utter failures and the strikes had now crippled the company's production line and finances. The Schlitz management team finally threw in the towel and began negotiating a deal to sell the company and cut their losses. As the Milwaukee plant was the oldest and least efficient of the Schlitz breweries, and unable to afford to keep operating it due to the strike, Schlitz closed the doors to the Milwaukee brewery, thus ending the strike and, ultimately, signaling the end for Schlitz being one of the most popular beer companies in America. 

The Baldwinsville brewery was purchased by Anheuser-Busch in 1981 to supplement production of the upcoming Budweiser Light – now Bud Light – release in 1982. Because of the nonstandard brewery design, Baldwinsville is unique and capable of complex production, making it a key player in the 12 domestic Anheuser-Busch plants. In 1982, there were competing bids for ownership of the Schlitz brand. The Stroh Brewery Company of Detroit, Michigan beat out Pabst and Heileman by bidding for 67 percent of Schlitz. By spring of that year, Stroh had purchased the entire company, making Stroh's the third largest brewing enterprise in America. During the takeover, Schlitz fought a fierce battle in the courts trying to remain independent. 

Schlitz finally accepted the takeover when Stroh raised its offer from an initial $16 per share to $17, and the U.S. Justice Department approved the acquisition once Stroh agreed to sell either Schlitz's Memphis or Winston-Salem breweries. The Milwaukee Schlitz Brewhouse stood unused after the sale to Stroh, until it was demolished in 2013. What remained of the historic Schlitz Brewery complex in Milwaukee was transformed with tax increment financing and other government support into a mixed-use development called Schlitz Park.

Pabst acquisition and revival
The once-strong Schlitz brand was relegated to cheap beer or "bargain brand" status and became increasingly difficult to find in bars and restaurants. Ironically enough, Stroh itself was beginning to struggle from the weight of its business, and had never been able to get out from under the debt it incurred when purchasing Schlitz. In 1999, Pabst Brewing Company gained control of the Schlitz brand with its acquisition of the Stroh Brewery Company.
 
During the reformulating period of the early 1970s, the original Schlitz beer formula was lost and never included in any of the subsequent sales of the company.  Through research of documents and interviews with former Schlitz brewmasters and taste-testers, Pabst was able to reconstruct the 1960s classic formula. The new Schlitz beer, along with a new television advertising campaign, was officially introduced in 2008. The first markets for relaunching included Chicago, Florida, Boston, Minneapolis-Saint Paul, and Schlitz's former headquarters, Milwaukee. The classic 1960s theme was also reflected when 1968 Playboy magazine playmate Cynthia Myers became a spokeswoman for Schlitz beer in 2009.

In 2014, Pabst Brewing Company was purchased by American entrepreneur Eugene Kashper and TSG Consumer Partners. The deal included the Schlitz brand, as well as Pabst Blue Ribbon, Old Milwaukee, and Colt 45.

Pabst Brewing Company, now headquartered in Los Angeles, continues to produce Schlitz beer, Old Milwaukee, and four Schlitz malt liquors—Schlitz Red Bull, Schlitz Bull Ice, Schlitz High Gravity, and Schlitz Malt Liquor. Although it has fallen from its former title as one of America's most popular beers, the Schlitz brand is still alive today and remains a sentimental favorite in the Midwest.

Products

 Schlitz: American-style lager
 Schlitz Light: Light lager
 Schlitz Dark: Dark version of the original lager
 Schlitz Malt Liquor: Malt liquor
 Schlitz Red Bull: Malt liquor
 Schlitz Ice: Ice-brewed lager
 Old Milwaukee: American-style lager
 Primo: American-style lager

Slogans
 "The beer that made Milwaukee famous"
 "When you're out of Schlitz, you're out of beer"
 "Real Gusto!"
 "Just the kiss of the hops"
 "Move up to Schlitz"
 "The greatest name in beer"
 "Schlitz Rocks America"
 “Go for the Gusto”
 "When it's right, you know it"

See also
 Beer in Milwaukee
 List of defunct breweries in the United States
 Schlitz Playhouse of Stars and Pulitzer Prize Playhouse, sponsored television series
 Union Refrigerator Transit Line, a private refrigerator car line established by Schlitz in 1895
 "What's Made Milwaukee Famous (Has Made a Loser Out of Me)", a 1968 song

References

External links
 Schlitz Beer commercials of the 1970s
 Official website
 Official website (Gusto)
 Collection of mid-twentieth century advertising featuring Schlitz beer from the TJS Labs Gallery of Graphic Design
 Historic American Engineering Record (HAER) documentation, filed under Milwaukee, Milwaukee County, WI:
 
 
 
 
 
 

1849 establishments in Wisconsin
American beer brands
American companies established in 1849
Companies based in Milwaukee
Defunct brewery companies of the United States
Historic American Engineering Record in Wisconsin
Pabst Brewing Company
Uihlein Family